The Siberian Snipers or Hockey Team Sibirskie Snaypery is a junior ice hockey team from Novosibirsk, which contains players from the HC Sibir Novosibirsk school. They are members of the Russian Junior Hockey League, the top tier of junior hockey in the country.

Name 
The MHL club's name must not be the same as their affiliated Kontinental Hockey League club's name. So the former name of the team, Sibir-2, was changed. There were some variants for the junior club's new name. Fans were invited to vote for either Siberian Foxes, Siberian or Siberian Snipers, but the club's board decided to name the club Siberian Snipers.

NHL Alumni
Vladimir Tarasenko
Nikita Zaitsev

External links 
MHL profile
Official website

2009 establishments in Russia
Ice hockey clubs established in 2009
Ice hockey teams in Russia
Junior Hockey League (Russia) teams
HC Sibir Novosibirsk